Kuschelydrus phreaticus is a species of beetles in the family Dytiscidae, the only species in the genus Kuschelydrus.

Footnotes

References

Dytiscidae genera
Monotypic Adephaga genera